Frank Jacob may refer to:

Frank Jacob (historian) (born 1984), German historian and Japanologist
Frank Jacob (bobsleigh), German bobsledder and bobsleigh coach

See also
Frank Jacobs (1929–2021), American author